Lita or LITA may refer to:

People
Lita (given name)
Lita (wrestler) (born 1975), American professional wrestler
Adriana Lita, Materials scientist
Leroy Lita (born 1984), Congo football player
Selina Jahan Lita, Bangladesh Awami League politician and Member of Parliament

Places
Lita, Jiangxi, China
Lita, Cluj, Romania
Lița, Romania
Lita, a moon of Jupiter

Other uses
Lita (album), an album by Lita Ford
Lita, a name for Lithuanian Jews
Lita, fictional currency used in the Star Trek universe by Bajorans
Left internal thoracic artery (LITA), an arterial conduit often used for coronary artery bypass surgery
Library and Information Technology Association
List and Tabulate (LITA), a precursor of the programming language Filetab
Lithuanian litas, the former currency of Lithuania